The Red Line, also known as Line 3, was a proposed line of the Montreal Metro that never made it past its planning stage. The line was supposed to have 15 stations and end at Cartierville (western) of Bordeaux-Cartierville, using CN tracks and Mount Royal Tunnel under Mount Royal. The line was cancelled because:

 Trains would have to use steel wheels instead of rubber tires like the rest of the Metro cars because part (or most) of the line was to go outside.
 Expo 67 made the Yellow Line more important.
The line was still planned for construction as a "regional metro" line in the early 1980s, reduced to a total of 9 stations. 

The tracks were used by the commuter rail Deux-Montagnes Line between 1995 and 2020, and will form the central section of the planned  Réseau express métropolitain.

1982 list of planned stations
The following stations were planned for the line:
 Gare Centrale
 Vincent D'Indy
 Mont-Royal
 Côte-Vertu
 Bois-Franc
 A-Ma-Baie
 Roxboro
 Laval
 Deux-Montagnes

See also
 Line 6 (Montreal Metro)
 Line 7 White (Montreal Metro)

References

External links 
 Tunnel

Montreal Metro
Unbuilt buildings and structures in Canada
Cancelled rapid transit lines and systems
Cancelled projects in Canada